Mission: Impossible – Dead Reckoning Part Two is an upcoming American action spy film written and directed by Christopher McQuarrie, who is also producing it with Tom Cruise. Based on the television series Mission: Impossible by Bruce Geller, it is a direct sequel to Mission: Impossible – Dead Reckoning Part One (2023), and the eighth and final installment in the Mission: Impossible film series.

Cruise returns in his eighth appearance as the series's lead character, Ethan Hunt, whom he would have portrayed for over 28 years by the time the film is released; it is expected to be his final appearance in the series. Ving Rhames, Henry Czerny, Simon Pegg, Rebecca Ferguson, Vanessa Kirby, Hayley Atwell, Shea Whigham and Pom Klementieff all return in their roles from previous films in the series. Esai Morales returns from the seventh film as the villain.

The film is scheduled to be released by Paramount Pictures on June 28, 2024.

Cast

Tom Cruise as Ethan Hunt, an IMF agent and leader of a team of operatives.
Ving Rhames as Luther Stickell, an IMF computer technician, a member of Hunt's team and his closest friend.
Henry Czerny as Eugene Kittridge, the former director of IMF last seen in the first Mission: Impossible film.
Simon Pegg as Benji Dunn, an IMF technical field agent and a member of Hunt's team.
Rebecca Ferguson as Ilsa Faust, a former MI6 agent who allied with Hunt's team during Rogue Nation and Fallout.
Hayley Atwell as Grace.
Vanessa Kirby as Alanna Mitsopolis, a black market arms dealer also known as the White Widow.
Esai Morales as the main antagonist. Morales returns from the previous film.
Shea Whigham as Jasper Briggs.
Holt McCallany as Bernstein, the Secretary of Defense. 
Nick Offerman as Sydney.

Additionally, Pom Klementieff, Mark Gatiss, Charles Parnell, Janet McTeer, Mariela Garriga, and Hannah Waddingham have been cast in undisclosed roles.

Production

Development 
On January 14, 2019, Cruise initially announced that the seventh and eighth Mission: Impossible films would be shot back-to-back with McQuarrie writing and directing both films for July 23, 2021, and August 5, 2022 releases. However, in February 2021, Deadline Hollywood revealed that Paramount had decided to no longer move forward with that plan. It was reported that both films would be a "send-off" to the Ethan Hunt character.

Casting 
In February 2019, Ferguson confirmed her return for the seventh installment, while Hayley Atwell and Pom Klementieff joined the film's cast in September. In December, Simon Pegg confirmed his return for the film, while Shea Whigham was also cast. Nicholas Hoult joined the cast by January 2020, along with Henry Czerny, who will reprise his role as Eugene Kittridge for the first time since the 1996 film. Vanessa Kirby also announced she was returning for both films. However, due to scheduling conflicts, Hoult was replaced by Esai Morales for both films.  In July 2022, it was reported that Holt McCallany had joined the cast. In August, it was revealed Nick Offerman and Janet McTeer were also added to the cast. In March 2023, McQuarrie announced Hannah Waddingham's addition to the cast.

Filming 
In February 2021, Deadline Hollywood reported that the film will no longer be filmed back-to-back with Mission: Impossible – Dead Reckoning Part One. By November, McQuarrie was in the process of rewriting the film.  On March 24, 2022, Collider reported the beginning of principal photography of Mission: Impossible – Dead Reckoning Part Two. Filming took place in the UK at Longcross Studios and the Lake District. Other locations included Malta, South Africa and Norway. In December 2022, it was reported filming was finished in the UK. The crew, then, moved to Puglia to continue filming aboard the USS George H.W. Bush aircraft carrier.

Post-production 
Industrial Light & Magic return to do the visual effects from the 7th film along with Clear Angle Studios and Halon Entertainment being the additional vendors for lidar & cyberscanning and previsualization.

Release
The film is scheduled to be released on June 28, 2024. It was previously set for release on August 5, 2022, but was delayed to November 4, 2022, July 7, 2023, and then to the current date due to the COVID-19 pandemic.

References

External links

2020s English-language films
2024 action thriller films
2020s spy films
American action thriller films
American sequel films
American spy films
Bad Robot Productions films
Films based on television series
Films directed by Christopher McQuarrie
Films postponed due to the COVID-19 pandemic
Films produced by Tom Cruise
Films scored by Lorne Balfe
Films with screenplays by Christopher McQuarrie
Mission: Impossible (film series)
Skydance Media films
Paramount Pictures films
Upcoming films
Upcoming sequel films
2020s American films
American spy action films